Lookout Valley Middle School and High School is a school in Chattanooga, Tennessee, in Hamilton County. It is operated by the Hamilton County Schools system.

History
Lookout Valley Junior High School was established in 1957 as the community grew.  Lookout Valley Jr. High eventually became Lookout Valley High School, graduating its first class in 1973. In 1989, sixth grade was added when two elementary schools combined; Valley View Elementary School (Lookout Valley Elementary) and John A. Patten Elementary School.

Leadership 
In Fall 2020, Lee Ann McBryar became the principal.

List of principals 
This is a partial list of former school principals with term start and end dates.
 Dr. Lee McDade ( - 2011)
 Rick Rushworth (2011, retired in 2018)
 Todd Stinson (2018 - )

Notable alumni
 Mike Cameron - Politician. Member of Georgia House of Representatives.  
Ginny Crawford,  (1989)NASA Engineer
Larry Knight (1981), Sports
Lewis Smith, Actor
Harley Woody, Sports
Katie Galloway Burrows(2001) (Former UTC Women's Basketball Head Coach)
Joe Graham (1984)former Hamilton County commissioner

References

External links

Public high schools in Tennessee
Public middle schools in Tennessee
Schools in Chattanooga, Tennessee
Educational institutions established in 1957
1957 establishments in Tennessee